The Engelberger House is a historic house at 2105 North Maple Street in North Little Rock, Arkansas.  It is a two-story wood-frame structure, with a hip roof and asymmetrical massing characteristic of the Queen Anne style of architecture.  It has several projecting gable sections, an octagonal tower at one corner, and a porch that wraps around two sides.  It was built in 1895 by Alonzo "Lonnie" Clayton, an African American jockey and the youngest to win the Kentucky Derby. Lonnie was 15 years old when he won the Kentucky Derby in 1892. The Engelberger House is one of only two high-style Queen Anne houses in the city (the other is the Baker House).

The house was listed on the National Register of Historic Places in 1990.

See also
National Register of Historic Places listings in Pulaski County, Arkansas

References

Houses on the National Register of Historic Places in Arkansas
Queen Anne architecture in Arkansas
Houses in North Little Rock, Arkansas
National Register of Historic Places in Pulaski County, Arkansas